Jindřich Polák (5 May 1925 – 22 August 2003) was a Czech film and television director. He is known for his science fiction productions, but worked in many different genres.

Filmography

Television series

References

External links
 

1925 births
2003 deaths
Czechoslovak film directors
Film directors from Prague